Tim Mayotte was the defending champion but did not compete that year.

Ivan Lendl won in the final 3–6, 6–1, 7–6, 6–4 against Mats Wilander.

Seeds

Main draw

Finals

Top half

Section 1

Section 2

Section 3

Section 4

Bottom half

Section 5

Section 6

Section 7

Section 8

References
 1986 Lipton International Players Championships Draw

Men's Singles